Ross David Lupton (born 6 January 1975) is a former Australian cricketer.  Lupton was a right-handed batsman who bowled right-arm medium pace.  He was born at Warwick, Queensland.

Lupton made a single List A match for Herefordshire against the Sussex Cricket Board in the 1st round of the 2000 NatWest Trophy. In his only List A match, he scored 24 runs and with the ball he took 2 wickets at a bowling average of 16.50, with best figures of 2/33.

References

External links
Ross Lupton at Cricinfo
Ross Lupton at CricketArchive

1975 births
Living people
People from Warwick, Queensland
Australian cricketers
Herefordshire cricketers
Cricketers from Queensland